Thomas Oger (born 22 March 1980) is a professional Monegasque tennis player.

Oger reached his highest individual ranking on the ATP Tour on October 29, 2007, when he became World number 249.  He primarily plays on the Futures circuit and the Challenger circuit. Oger has been a member of the Monegasque Davis Cup team since 2010, having posted a 3–3 record in singles and a 2–2 record in doubles in six ties played.

Tour singles finals – all levels (8–9)

External links
 
 
 

1980 births
Monegasque male tennis players
Living people